Maria Salviati (17 July 1499 – 29 December 1543) was a Florentine noblewoman, the daughter of Lucrezia di Lorenzo de' Medici and Jacopo Salviati. She married Giovanni delle Bande Nere and was the mother of Cosimo I de Medici. Her husband died 30 November 1526, leaving her a widow at the age of 27.  Salviati never remarried; after her husband's death she adopted the somber garb of a novice, which is how she is remembered today as numerous late portraits show her attired in black and white.

Life
Maria Salviati was born in Florence. She descended from two of Florence's most powerful banking families: the Salviati on her father's side, and the de' Medici on her mother's. Her maternal grandfather was Lorenzo "il Magnifico".

When her cousin, Alessandro de' Medici was assassinated in 1537, Maria used her family connections to get involved in the discussions to decide the next Duke of Florence.  She played a key role in getting her son, Cosimo I de' Medici, elected.

Bia de' Medici 

Maria set up residence at Villa di Castello in northern Florence, there she would look after her grandchildren. Her son Cosimo had an illegitimate daughter called Bia de' Medici. Maria described her granddaughter as a very happy and talkative little girl, often having long conversations with her.

Cosimo married Eleonora di Toledo in 1539. It was rumoured that Eleonora refused to tolerate Bia's presence in the palace after their marriage so Cosimo sent Bia off to live with Maria. Other sources say that Eleonora brought Bia up very lovingly. Bia shared a nursery with Giulia de' Medici an illegitimate daughter of Alessandro de' Medici, Duke of Florence, the pair being close in age. Maria knew who Bia's mother was but she would never tell Bia or anyone else the name of the woman. Both Bia and her cousin Giulia contracted a virulent fever; Giulia recovered from the illness but Bia only worsened and eventually died on 1 March 1542 aged only five years. Maria and Cosimo were said to be very sad by her loss.

Maria died one year after Bia on 29 December 1543.

Ancestors

Descendants
Salviati's descendants became crowned figureheads of Europe over the succeeding generations.  Her grandson Francesco I de' Medici married Johanna of Austria; they were the parents of Eleonora de' Medici, who married Vincenzo I Gonzaga and was the mother of Francesco IV Gonzaga. Francesco and Johanna's other daughter was Marie de' Medici, who married Henry IV of France and was the mother of Louis XIII of France and Henrietta Maria of France.  Louis was the father of Louis XIV of France, Henrietta Maria was the mother of Charles II of England and James II of England.

References

Sources

See also 

 Ancestors of Cosimo I de Medici

1543 deaths
1499 births
Nobility from Florence
House of Medici
Maria
Burials at San Lorenzo, Florence
16th-century Italian women